Aage Carl Christian Lassen (born 9 January 1943) is a Danish sailor. He competed in the 5.5 Metre event at the 1964 Summer Olympics.

References

External links
 
 

1943 births
Living people
Danish male sailors (sport)
Olympic sailors of Denmark
Sailors at the 1964 Summer Olympics – 5.5 Metre
Sportspeople from Copenhagen